Jerzy Ryszard "Jurry" Zieliński (1943–1980) was a Polish painter and poet.

Zieliński was born in Kazimierzów, Opoczno County, Poland, in 1943. He graduated from the Warsaw Academy of Fine Arts in 1968, with a diploma in painting. He died in Warsaw in 1980.

His artistic style was inspired by pop art and Art Nouveau, and his work in turn inspired many young artists, such as the art groups Gruppa and Twożywo. In 1965, he and Jan Dobkowski founded the art group Neo Neo Neo. His artworks have been described as "znaki drogowe politycznej egzystencji w PRL" ("road signs of the political existence in the PRL [People's Republic of Poland]"). In 2010, on the 30th anniversary of Zieliński's death, a two-piece bumper gallery exhibition was held at the National Museum in Kraków, celebrating his life and work. The exhibition was accompanied by the publication of a 300-page monograph, which analyses the historical significance and contemporary relevance of Zieliński's work.

References
 Kitowska-Lysiak, Margaret (November 2006). "Jerzy Ryszard Zieliński (Jurry)" . Culture.pl. 
 "Jerzy 'Jurry' Zieliński" . Poland-art.com. Retrieved 25 April 2013.

1943 births
1980 deaths
Academy of Fine Arts in Warsaw alumni
People from Opoczno County